The East Germany Olympic football team, recognized as Germany DR by FIFA, was from 1952 to 1990 the football team of East Germany for Olympic football events, playing as one of three post-war German teams, along with Saarland and West Germany.

After German reunification in 1990, the Deutscher Fußball-Verband der DDR (DFV), and with it the East German team, joined the Deutscher Fußball-Bund (DFB).

Overall record

See also
 East Germany national football team
 East Germany national under-21 football team
 Germany Olympic football team

Notes

External links
DFB statistics of the national team (contains information on East Germany caps and goalscorers)
RSSSF archive of East Germany results
RSSSF history of East Germany national team
RSSSF record of East Germany international caps and goals

 
European Olympic national association football teams
Oly
Football
Germany Olympic football team